Kociszew may refer to the following places in Poland:

 Kociszew, Łódź Voivodeship
 Kociszew, Masovian Voivodeship